Naluguroadlu is a village in Gangavaram mandal, located in Chittoor district of Andhra Pradesh, India. It comes under Gandrajupalle Panchayath and forms a part of the Rayalaseema region.

Villages in Chittoor district